Sakhma is a rural locality (a selo) in Sizobugorsky Selsoviet of Volodarsky District, Astrakhan Oblast, Russia. The population was 379 as of 2010. There are 3 streets.

Geography 
Sakhma is located 30 km south of Volodarsky (the district's administrative centre) by road. Plotovinka is the nearest rural locality.

References 

Rural localities in Volodarsky District, Astrakhan Oblast